Piki Te Ora Hamahona (born 29 May 1982) is a former field hockey player from New Zealand, who played as a forward.

Personal life
While being born and raised in Whanganui, Hamahona resides in Wollongong, on the East Coast of Australia.

Piki Hamahona is the younger sister of former New Zealand international, Marama Hamahona.

Career

Domestic hockey
Hamahona has appeared in both Australia and New Zealand's national hockey leagues, the AHL and Ford NHL.

International hockey

Under–21
In 2000, Hamahona was a member of the New Zealand U–21 at the Junior Oceania Cup in Canberra. At the tournament, Hamahona won a silver medal.

The following year Hamahona represented the team again, at the 2001 FIH Junior World Cup in Buenos Aires, where the team finished 5th.

Black Sticks
Hamahona made her debut for the Black Sticks in 2001.

Her first major tournament with the national team was in 2002, at the FIH Champions Trophy in Macau. She represented the team later that year at the  FIH World Cup in Perth.

Following a six-year hiatus from the national squad, Hamahona was recalled to the squad in 2009.

References

External links

1982 births
Living people
New Zealand female field hockey players
Female field hockey forwards
20th-century New Zealand women
21st-century New Zealand women